The Michigan Sports Hall of Fame is a Hall of Fame to honor Michigan sports athletes, coaches and contributors. It was organized in 1954 by Michigan Lieutenant Governor Philip Hart, Michigan State University athletic director Biggie Munn, president of the Greater Michigan Foundation Donald Weeks, general manager of the Detroit Lions W. Nicholas Kerbawy and George Alderton of the Lansing State Journal. The inaugural class was inducted in 1955. Scott Lesher is its current chairman and Jordan Fields the president.

The Michigan Sports Hall of Fame also sponsors the Michigan MAC Trophy and the Michigan Sports Hall of Fame Cup. The MSHOF Class of 2022 will be enshrined on September 10, 2022 in Detroit, including Chris Webber, Meryl Davis, Charlie White, Jennie Ritter, Antonio Gates, John Beilein, Mickey Redmond, and Kathy Beauregard. Shane Battier — part of the 2021 class — was also be honored at the 2022 ceremony.

Inductees

1950s

 Jack Adams, 1955
 Dutch Clark, 1959
 Sam Crawford, 1958
 Ty Cobb, 1955
 Mickey Cochrane, 1956
 Gus Dorais, 1958
 Ray Fisher, 1959
 Charlie Gehringer, 1956
 George Gipp, 1957

 Hank Greenberg, 1958
 Walter Hagen, 1955
 Harry Heilmann, 1956
 Willie Heston, 1955
 Gordie Howe, 1957
 Hughie Jennings, 1958
 Stanley Ketchel, 1959
 Marion Ladewig, 1959
 Joe Louis, 1955
 Matt Mann, 1959
 Bennie Oosterbaan, 1958
 Allen Stowe, 1959
 Eddie Tolan, 1958
 Garfield Wood, 1956
 Fielding H. Yost, 1955

1960s

 Sid Abel, 1967
 Lloyd Brazil, 1961
 Tommy Bridges, 1963
 Walter Briggs, Sr., 1969
 Michael "Dad" Butler, 1960
 Fritz Crisler, 1960
 Kiki Cuyler, 1963
 Wish Egan, 1960
 Benny Friedman, 1961
 Ebbie Goodfellow, 1968
 Goose Goslin, 1965
 Tom Harmon, 1962
 Bill Hewitt, 1961
 Guy Houston, 1963
 Jean Hoxie, 1965
 Hayes Jones, 1969
 George Kell, 1969
 Harry Kipke, 1968
 John Kobs, 1968
 Bobby Layne, 1966
 Kid Lavigne, 1965
 Ted Lindsay, 1966
 Heinie Manush, 1964
 Fred Matthaei, 1964
 Jacob Mazer, 1967
 George Mullin, 1962
 Biggie Munn, 1961
 Hal Newhouser, 1962
 Branch Rickey, 1961
 Schoolboy Rowe, 1961
 Germany Schulz, 1960
 George Sisler, 1960
 Horton Smith, 1960
 Doak Walker, 1967
 Al Watrous, 1962
 Byron White, 1962
 Adolph Wolgast, 1964
 George Young, 1966
 Ralph Young, 1962

1970s

 Vince Banonis, 1975
 Les Bingaman, 1971
 Sam Bishop, 1977
 Bob Calihan, 1971
 Don Canham, 1978
 Duffy Daugherty, 1975
 Dave DeBusschere, 1977
 Alex Delvecchio, 1977
 Gerald Ford, 1977
 Henry Ford, 1978
 Charles Forsythe, 1970
 Lyman Frimodig, 1976
 Lofton Greene, 1974
 Ace Gutowsky, 1979
 David Holmes, 1975
 Hudson High School football team, 1976
 Al Kaline, 1978
 Chuck Kocsis, 1974
 Ron Kramer, 1971
 Ann Marston, 1977
 Fr. James Martin, 1978
 Terry McDermott, 1972
 Earl Morrall, 1979
 Frank Navin, 1976
 James F. Norris Sr., 1976
 Buddy Parker, 1976
 John Pingel, 1973
 Warren Orlick, 1979
 George Richards, 1976
 Billy Rogell, 1970
 Mauri Rose, 1972
 Philip Sachs, 1973
 Terry Sawchuk, 1974
 Norbert Schemansky, 1976
 Joe Schmidt, 1970
 Graham Steenhoven, 1979
 Lorenzo Wright, 1973
 Rudy York, 1972
 Fred Zollner, 1976

1980s

 Mike Adray, 1983
 Lem Barney, 1985
 Dave Bing, 1984
 Jim Bunning, 1981
 Jim Campbell, 1985
 Norm Cash, 1984
 Jack Castignola, 1988
 Lynn Chandnois, 1988
 Jack Christiansen, 1986
 Istvan Danosi, 1985
 Chuck Davey, 1980
 Pete Dawkins, 1987
 Pete Elliott, 1983
 Andy Farkas, 1983
 John Fetzer, 1984
 Bill Freehan, 1982
 Bill Gadsby, 1986
 Chick Harbert, 1989
 Ernie Harwell, 1989
 John Hiller, 1989
 Robert Hoernschemeyer, 1985
 Willie Horton, 1987
 Glenn Johnson, 1988
 Joe Joseph, 1980
 Alex Karras, 1980
 Cliff Keen, 1981
 Nick Kerbawy, 1985
 Dick "Night Train" Lane, 1988
 Bob Lanier, 1989
 Yale Lary, 1988
 Mickey Lolich, 1982
 Don Lund, 1987
 John MacInnes, 1984
 Dick McAuliffe, 1986
 Kayo Morgan, 1987
 Bill Muncey, 1983
 Jeanne Omelenchuk, 1984
 Donald Ridler, 1981
 Will Robinson, 1982
 Bo Schembechler, 1989
 Virgil Trucks, 1985
 Bob Ufer, 1982
 Willis Ward, 1981
 Vic Wertz, 1983
 Bob Westfall, 1986
 George Wilson, 1980
 Sheila Young, 1988

1990s

 Herb Adderley, 1996
 Sparky Anderson, 1992
 Carl Angelo, 1994
 Terry Barr, 1995
 Red Berenson, 1996
 Cloyce Box, 1991
 Scotty Bowman, 1999
 Wally Burkemo, 1990
 Bob Carey, 1990
 Paul Carey, 1992
 Don Coleman, 1997
 Chuck Daly, 1996
 James David, 1997
 Dick Enberg, 1995
 Al Fracassa, 1999
 Eddie Futch, 1997
 Kirk Gibson, 1999
 Leon Hart, 1997
 Spencer Haywood, 1993
 Thomas Hearns, 1997
 Dave Hill, 1996
 Mike Hill, 1994
 Gordon Johncock, 1992
 Magic Johnson, 1998
 Vinnie Johnson, 1997
 Leonard "Red" Kelly, 1998
 Micki King, 1993
 Harvey Kuenn, 1993
 Bill Laimbeer, 1999
 Ray Lane, 1997
 Eddie Lubanski, 1992
 Budd Lynch, 1994
 Bruce Martyn, 1996
 Ron Mason, 1994
 Charlie Maxwell, 1997
 Barney McCosky, 1995
 Reggie McKenzie, 1994
 Denny McLain, 1991
 Bob Miller, 1999
 Van Patrick, 1991
 Roger Penske, 1999
 Bob Reynolds, 1998
 Robin Roberts, 1999
 Sugar Ray Robinson, 1991
 Cazzie Russell, 1991
 Charlie Sanders, 1990
 Hal Schram, 1990
 Bubba Smith, 1993
 Billy Sims, 1990
 Mickey Stanley, 1994
 Emanuel Steward, 1996
 Isiah Thomas, 1998
 Rudy Tomjanovich, 1995
 Ty Tyson, 1996
 Franklin "Muddy" Waters, 1992
 George Webster, 1998

2000s

 Jim Abbott, 2004
 Kathy Arendsen, 2003
 Jane "Peaches" Bartkowicz, 2002
 Greg Barton, 2007
 Frank Beckmann, 2007
 George Blaha, 2008
 Gates Brown, 2002
 Henry Carr, 2000
 Anthony Carter, 2000
 Lou Creekmur, 2003
 William Davidson, 2004
 Joe DeLamielleure, 2004
 Herb Deromedi, 2004
 Jim Devellano, 2006
 Leo Diegel, 2005
 Dan Dierdorf, 2001
 Dave Diles, 2006
 Joe Dumars, 2003
 Bump Elliott, 2002
 Joe Falls, 2000
 Bill Flemming, 2008
 William Clay Ford, Sr., 2005
 Steve Fraser, 2008
 George Gervin, 2001
 Sonny Grandelius, 2006
 Jerry Green, 2003
 Jud Heathcote, 2000
 John Herrington, 2001
 Desmond Howard, 2007
 Mike Ilitch, 2004
 Ron Johnson, 2005
 Jim Kaat, 2002
 Greg Kelser, 2007
 Johnny Kline, 2005
 Paul Krause, 2005
 Julie Krone, 2005
 Diane Laffey, 2006
 Pat LaFontaine, 2004
 Mike Lucci, 2004
 Dan Majerle, 2006
 J. P. McCarthy, 2001
 Jack McCloskey, 2006
 Jack Morris, 2001
 Jack Moss, 2005
 Shirley Muldowney, 2003
 Jim Northrup, 2000
 Lance Parrish, 2002
 Calvin Peete, 2005
 George Perles, 2005
 Billy Pierce, 2003
 George Puscas, 2004
 Glen Rice, 2007
 H. G. Salsinger, 2002
 Barry Sanders, 2003
 Clark Scholes, 2007
 Ray Scott, 2007
 Chris Spielman, 2004
 Fred Stabley, 2004
 Turkey Stearnes, 2007
 Black Jack Stewart, 2000
 Frank Tanana, 2006
 Alan Trammell, 2000
 Norm Ullman, 2007
 Brad Van Pelt, 2002
 Wayne Walker, 2001
 Sam Washington, 2007
 Lou Whitaker, 2000
 George Yardley, 2001
Steve Yzerman, 2007

2010s

 George Acker Jr., 2012 
 Mitch Albom, 2017
 George Allen, 2012
 Fred Arbanas, 2012
 B. J. Armstrong, 2018
 Harry Atkins, 2019
 Carl Banks, 2011
 Bob Becker, 2010
 Chuck Bernard, 2012
 Jerome Bettis, 2011
 Jim Brandstatter, 2014
 Lomas Brown, 2013
 Ed Budde, 2012
 Lloyd Carr, 2011
 Rex Cawley, 2012
 Bob Chappuis, 2012
 Daedra Charles-Furrow, 2018
 Mateen Cleaves, 2013
 Charlie Coles, 2018
 Tom D'Eath, 2012
 Bob Devaney, 2012
 Dorne Dibble, 2014
 Diane Dietz, 2019
 T. J. Duckett, 2018
 Tony Dungy, 2013
 Doug English, 2015
 Sergei Fedorov, 2015
 Dan Fife, 2019
 Cullen Finnerty, 2018
 Tom Gage, 2016
 Jason Hanson, 2014
 Willie Hernández, 2012
 Pete Hovland, 2016
 Mark Howe, 2013
 Carol Hutchins, 2011
 Marian Ilitch, 2010
 Tom Izzo, 2015
 Jon Jansen, 2017
 Derek Jeter, 2016
 Richie Jordan, 2012
 Peter Karmanos, 2010
 Greg Kampe, 2017
 Dick Kimball, 2013
 Vladimir Konstantinov, 2019
 Alexi Lalas, 2014
 Barry Larkin, 2015
 Rick Leach, 2010
 Dick LeBeau, 2011
 Jim Leyland, 2017
 Nicklas Lidström, 2014
 Eugene Lipscomb, 2012
 Earl Lloyd, 2012
 John Long, 2016
 Dean Look, 2017
 Tom Mach, 2014
 Meg Mallon, 2010
 Bob Mann, 2016
 Barbara Marchetti-DeSchepper, 2012
 Mike McCabe, 2018
 Kathy McGee, 2016
 Pamela McGee, 2013
 Greg Meyer, 2011
 Mike Modano, 2015
 Herman Moore, 2010
 Eddie Murray, 2010
 Mike O'Hara, 2019
 Chris Osgood, 2016
 Milt Pappas, 2012
 Morris Peterson, 2019
 Robert Porcher, 2018
 Charlie Primas, 2012
 Marcel Pronovost, 2012
 Andre Rison, 2017
 Jalen Rose, 2017
 Dan Roundfield, 2012
 Jack Roush, 2010
 Allison Schmitt, 2019
 Brendan Shanahan, 2016
 Aleta Sill, 2015
 Ted Simmons, 2012
 Ralph Simpson, 2012
 John Smoltz, 2014
 Kate Sobrero-Markgraf, 2018
 John Spring, 2011
 Steve Smith, 2013
 Bob Strampe, 2012
 Sheila Taormina, 2015
 Ron Thompson, 2011
 Jon Urbanchek, 2010
 Chet Walker, 2012
 Ben Wallace, 2016
 Bill Watson, 2012
 Tyrone Wheatley, 2013
 Tom Wilson, 2019
 Alex Wojciechowicz, 2012
 Charles Woodson, 2019

Michigan Sports Hall of Fame Cup
The Hall of Fame sponsors the Michigan Sports Hall of Fame Cup, a trophy given to the winner of the season basketball series between Oakland University and the University of Detroit Mercy men's basketball teams. The inaugural trophy, established in 2015, was won by the 2014–15 Oakland Golden Grizzlies men's basketball team. The teams split the season series, but Oakland won the tiebreaker due to having a better Rating Percentage Index (RPI) ranking at the time of the game.

References

External links
Official website

Sports in Detroit

Sports museums in Michigan
Halls of fame in Michigan
State sports halls of fame in the United States
All-sports halls of fame
Awards established in 1954